Scotorythra corticea is a moth of the family Geometridae. It was first described by Arthur Gardiner Butler in 1881. It is endemic to the Hawaiian island of Maui.

The larvae feed on Acacia koa.

External links

C
Endemic moths of Hawaii
Biota of Maui